Valentino Ravnić (born 20 July 1995) is a Croatian handball player for HC Dobrogea Sud Constanța and the Croatian national team.

He represented Croatia at the 2020 European Men's Handball Championship.

References

External links

1995 births
Living people
Sportspeople from Zadar
Croatian male handball players
RK Zagreb players
Competitors at the 2018 Mediterranean Games
Mediterranean Games gold medalists for Croatia
Mediterranean Games medalists in handball
21st-century Croatian people